Food Party is an American television series that airs on the Independent Film Channel in the United States.

The show is a pseudo-reality cooking show filmed on an elaborate, technicolored cardboard kitchen set.  Each episode features multi-course, out-of-this-world gourmet meals cooked up by hostess Thu Tran and a cast of colorful puppets for arriving "celebrity" guests.

The show was originally produced and filmed in Cleveland for two web series based episodes, and later relocated to Brooklyn for the final web series episodes and six IFC produced shows.

In October 2010, Thu Tran announced that the show was not picked up by IFC for a third season.

Characters

Characters and crew

Episodes

Season 1 (2009)

Season 2 (2010)

References

External links
IFC Food Party Site
Food Party Blog

IFC (American TV channel) original programming
2009 American television series debuts
2010 American television series endings